B-cell lymphoma 3-encoded protein is a protein that in humans is encoded by the BCL3 gene.

This gene is a proto-oncogene candidate. It is identified by its translocation into the immunoglobulin alpha-locus in some cases of B-cell leukemia. The protein encoded by this gene contains seven ankyrin repeats, which are most closely related to those found in I kappa B proteins. This protein functions as a transcriptional coactivator that activates through its association with NF-kappa B homodimers. The expression of this gene can be induced by NF-kappa B, which forms a part of the autoregulatory loop that controls the nuclear residence of p50 NF-kappa B.

Like BCL2, BCL5, BCL6, BCL7A, BCL9, and BCL10, it has clinical significance in lymphoma.

Interactions 

BCL3 has been shown to interact with:

 BARD1,
 C-Fos, 
 C-jun,
 C22orf25,
 COPS5,
 EP300,
 HTATIP,
 NFKB1,
 NFKB2,
 PIR,  and
 NR2B1.

Clinical significance 
Genetic variations in BCL3 gene have been associated with late-onset Alzheimer's disease (LOAD) and chronic lymphocytic leukemia. β-amyloid accumulation in neurons of Alzheimer's patients results in activation of NF-κB, which induces BCL3 expression. Increased expression of BCL3 has been observed in the brains of patients with LOAD.

The role of Bcl3 in solid tumors was established through the ability of Bcl3 to promote metastasis without affecting primary tumor growth or normal mammary function, within models of ErbB2-positive breast cancer. Further research has uncovered the role of Bcl3 in promoting progression of other solid tumors. The role of Bcl3 in promoting tumor hallmarks has been most widely reported for advanced colorectal cancer; where Bcl3 expression is up-regulated in >30% of colorectal cancer cases and is associated with a poor prognosis. For example, in colorectal cancer models, elevated Bcl3 expression was found to activate AKT signalling, drive a cancer stem cell phenotype through enhancing β-catenin signalling, drive the COX-2 mediated response to inflammatory cytokines, and protect colorectal tumor cells against DNA damage. The role of Bcl3 in enabling multiple cancer hallmarks in colorectal carcinogenesis has been reviewed.

More recently other cancer cell signalling pathways have been shown to be modulated by Bcl3. These include Wnt/beta-catenin through direct protein interaction; Smad3, through an unknown mechanism of protein stabilisation and transcriptional regulation of Stat3. Other pathways influenced by Bcl3 activity include phosphorylation of AKT through an unknown mechanism.

Role in cancer therapy 
Bcl3 also influences responses of cancer cells to treatment. Bcl3 promotes resistance to alkylating chemotherapy in gliomas, DNA damaging agents in colorectal cancer, and regulates the cancer immune checkpoint control gene PD-L1 in ovarian cancer cells.

The first discovery of a small molecule anti-metastatic Bcl3 inhibitor was reported utilising a virtual drug design and screening approach, targeting the protein-protein interaction between Bcl3 and partner protein p50. The virtual screening hit compound showed potent intracellular Bcl3-inhibitory activity, and led to reductions in NF-κB signalling, tumor colony formation and cancer cell migration within in vitro cellular models of breast cancer. In vivo inhibition of tumor growth and anti-metastatic activity was observed in invasive breast cancer models, without overt systemic toxicity.

References

Further reading

External links